The Libertarian Party of Australia was launched on 5 November 2020. It was built on the Workers Party's 1975 platform, continuing a legacy of anti-state, anti-war, and pro-market ideals. As of 2021, the party is not registered on any state electoral commission or the federal electoral commission.

The first minor Australian political party of the same name contested the 1983 federal election. It was formed in 1977 as a result of a split in the Workers Party over the adoption of the new name "Progress Party". The South Australian branch originally preserved the "Workers Party" name until 1980 when it changed its name to the Libertarian Party.

The Libertarian Party's "underlying principle", as stated on there website says: “No person or group of persons has the right to initiate the use of force, fraud or aggression against another person or group of persons.”

References

Defunct political parties in Australia
Libertarianism in Australia